Dibrugarh Assembly constituency is one of the 126 assembly constituencies of Assam a north east state of India. Dibrugarh is also part of Dibrugarh Lok Sabha constituency.

Dibrugarh Assembly constituency

Following are details on Dibrugarh Assembly constituency-

Country: India.
 State: Assam.
 District: Dibrugarh district.
 Lok Sabha Constituency: Dibrugarh Lok Sabha/Parliamentary constituency.
 Assembly Categorisation: Urban constituency.
 Literacy Level:  76.22%.
 Eligible Electors as per 2021 General Elections: 1,50,174 Eligible Electors. Male Electors:74,243. Female Electors:75,931 .
 Geographic Co-Ordinates:  27°33'49.7"N 94°56'44.9"E.
 Total Area Covered:436 square kilometres.
 Area Includes:  Jamirah and Dibrugarh mouzas in Dibrugarh thana in Dibrugarh sub-division, of Dibrugarh district of Assam.
 Inter State Border :Dibrugarh.
 Number Of Polling Stations: Year 2011-161,Year 2016-161,Year 2021-116.

Member of Legislative Assembly

Following is the list of past members representing Dibrugarh Assembly constituency in Assam Legislature.
 1957: Nilmoni Barthakur, Communist Party of India.
 1961 (By Polls): Ramesh C. Barooah, Indian National Congress.
 1962: Ramesh Chandra Barooah, Indian National Congress.
 1967: R. C. Barooah, Indian National Congress.
 1972: Ramesh Chandra Barooah, Indian National Congress.
 1978: Keshab Chandra Gogoi, Janata Party.
 1983: Keshab Chandra Gogoi, Indian National Congress.
 1985: Keshab Gogoi, Indian National Congress.
 1991: Keshab Gogoi, Indian National Congress.
 1996: Kalyan Kumar Gogoi, Indian National Congress.
 2001 (By Polls): Dr. Kalyan Kumar Gogoi, Indian National Congress.
 2001: Dr. Kalyan Kumar Gogoi, Indian National Congress.
 2006: Prasanta Phukan, Bharatiya Janata Party.
 2011: Prasanta Phukan, Bharatiya Janata Party.
 2016: Prasanta Phukan, Bharatiya Janata Party.
 2021: Prasanta Phukan, Bharatiya Janata Party.

Election results

2021

References

External links 
 

Assembly constituencies of Assam
Dibrugarh district